Mitzi Jayne Dean is a British-Canadian non-profit administrator and politician, who was elected to the Legislative Assembly of British Columbia in the 2017 provincial election. She represents the electoral district of Esquimalt-Metchosin as a member of the British Columbia New Democratic Party caucus. She is currently Minister for the Ministry of Children and Family Development.

Dean was appointed as the province's Parliamentary Secretary of the newly created Gender Equity Secretariat, in the Ministry of Finance, in February 2018 by Premier John Horgan.

Prior to her election, Dean was appointed the executive director for Pacific Centre Family Services in 2007, having moved to Victoria from England in 2005.

In the UK, Dean served in a fundraising role as a national development manager for children's services with the National Society for the Prevention of Cruelty to Children. She was born in Sevenoaks, England and worked in fundraising and development in organizations offering child protection social work and community-based social services across Great Britain for more than 20 years.

In 2014, Dean received a certificate in executive study for six months of online part-time study at Royal Roads University.

Electoral record

References

British Columbia New Democratic Party MLAs
British emigrants to Canada
Canadian social workers
English emigrants to Canada
Living people
People from Sevenoaks
Royal Roads University alumni
Women MLAs in British Columbia
21st-century Canadian politicians
21st-century Canadian women politicians
National Society for the Prevention of Cruelty to Children people
Year of birth missing (living people)